The Montana Arboretum and Gardens are located on the Montana State University campus in Bozeman, Montana. The Arboretum proper is located at the northwestern corner of campus by the intersection of West College Avenue and South 11th Avenue, but plantings occur throughout campus.

The small arboretum features native plants from the north Rocky Mountain region, the plains, and drier areas of Montana. It includes a Xeriscape garden and many established large specimens.

Plants
Plants in the arboretum proper include: Acer rubrum, Amelanchier alnifolia, Arctostaphylos uva-ursi, Caragana arboresens, Caragana frutex, Cercocarpus ledifolius, Fraxinus pennsylvanica, Juniperus chinensis, Juniperus communis, Lonicera tartarica, Lonicera x brownii, Malus spp., Pentaphylloides floribunda, Pinus ponderosa, Populus tremula, Rosa rugosa, Sorbus x hybrida, Syringa meyeri, Syringa vulgaris.

See also
 List of botanical gardens in the United States

External links
 Montana State University Bozeman Walking Tour - includes the Plant Growth Center with its indoor arboretum

Arboreta in Montana
Botanical gardens in Montana
Flora of the Rocky Mountains
Montana State University
Protected areas of Gallatin County, Montana
Tourist attractions in Bozeman, Montana

es:Arboretum y Jardines de Montana